Cierpisz  is a village in the administrative district of Gmina Łańcut, within Łańcut County, Subcarpathian Voivodeship, in south-eastern Poland.

The village has a population of 790.

Cierpisz originally Kraczkowa and hamlets named Wólki Kraczkowski. The first mention of the village dates back to 1624 and is contained in the document issued by the then owner Kraczkowa - Zbigniew Alexander Kornyakt.

Worth seeing 

Parish church. St. John the Baptist, built in 1987

Chapels - the main road there are two, built in 1937. Eucharistic Congress commemorated the Diocese of Przemysl, which took place a year earlier. In turn, the so-called. Cold Mountain in the Eastern branches of Stanislaw Pusz founded in 2000 year a chapel and the cross.

References

Villages in Łańcut County